The Wentworth Lear Historic Houses (formerly Wentworth-Gardner & Tobias Lear Historic House Association) are a pair of adjacent historic houses on the south waterfront in Portsmouth, New Hampshire.  Both buildings and an 18th-century warehouse are owned by the Wentworth Lear Historic Houses and are operated as a house museum.  They are located at the corner of Mechanic and Gardner Streets.  The two houses, built c. 1750–60, represent a study in contrast between high-style and vernacular Georgian styling. The Wentworth-Gardner House is a National Historic Landmark, and the houses are listed as the Wentworth-Gardner and Tobias Lear Houses on the National Register of Historic Places.

Tobias Lear House
The Tobias Lear House is a -story wood-frame structure built c. 1750.  It has clapboard siding, a hip roof with pedimented gable-roof dormers, and interior chimneys.  Its main facade is three bays wide, with a central entry framed by pilasters and topped by a triangular pediment.  The house has only modest woodwork detailing, both on its inside and outside.

The house was built by Tobias Lear, a merchant and ship's captain.  His son, also named Tobias Lear, was private secretary to President George Washington, and hosted Washington in this house during his visit to Portsmouth in 1789.  The house was sold out of the Lear family in 1861, and acquired in 1917 by architectural preservationist Wallace Nutting.  It was later purchased by the Society for the Preservation of New England Antiquities (SPNEA, now Historic New England), who transferred it to its present owners in 1940.

Wentworth-Gardner House

In contrast to the Lear House's modest styling, the Wentworth-Gardner House exemplifies high-style Georgian architecture, and is further notable for the role it played in the early years of the architectural preservation movement.  This -story wood-frame house was built in 1760 by Mark Hunking Wentworth, one of New Hampshire's wealthiest merchants and landowners, as a wedding present for his son Thomas.  The exterior of its main facade is flushboarded with corner quoining, giving it the appearance of masonry construction.  The side walls, and those of the rear ell, are clapboarded.  The main facade is five bays wide, with its center entry framed by a Colonial Revival surround added during restoration in 1916–18 by Wallace Nutting.  It has a hip roof, with a modillioned cornice.  Three dormers pierce each of the front and rear elevations, with the central dormer featuring a segmented-arch pediment, while the flanking ones have triangular pediments.  The interior is richly decorated with woodwork, particularly in the central hall and the public rooms.

Wallace Nutting purchased the house in 1916, and undertook its restoration.  In 1918 he sold it to the Metropolitan Museum of Art, which considered moving it to New York City for display, but this plan was abandoned in favor of in situ preservation.  The house was administered by SPNEA until it was turned over to the present owner in 1940.  The house was declared a National Historic Landmark in 1968.

Museum
The Wentworth Lear Historic Houses are open for tours Thursday-Monday between June and October; admission is charged, which includes both houses and the 18th-century warehouse.  The museum is also available for wedding & special occasion photography.

See also
National Register of Historic Places listings in Rockingham County, New Hampshire

References

External links
Wentworth Lear Historic Houses

Houses on the National Register of Historic Places in New Hampshire
Houses in Portsmouth, New Hampshire
Museums in Portsmouth, New Hampshire
Historic house museums in New Hampshire
Historic districts on the National Register of Historic Places in New Hampshire
National Register of Historic Places in Portsmouth, New Hampshire